The Shire of Bendemere was a local government area in the Maranoa region of Queensland, Australia, and existed from 1911 until 2008 when it amalgamated into Maranoa Region.

History
The Shire of Bendemere was established on 12 January 1911 from portions of the Shires of Bungil, Murilla and Warroo.

In July 2007, the Local Government Reform Commission released a report recommending a number of amalgamations of local government areas in Queensland. As a result, under the Local Government (Reform Implementation) Act 2007, on 15 March 2008, the new local government area of Roma Region was created, as an amalgamation of five previous local government areas:

 the Town of Roma;
 the Shire of Bendemere;
 the Shire of Booringa;
 the Shire of Bungil;
 and the Shire of Warroo.

On 26 July 2009, Roma Region was renamed Maranoa Region.

Towns and localities
The Shire of Bendemere included the following settlements:

 Yuleba
 Jackson
 Wallumbilla

Economy

The economy of the shire is mostly based around agriculture, including cattle, sheep and grain. Natural gas also plays a part, with gas wells being found throughout the shire and a liquified petroleum gas processing plant located just south of Wallumbilla.

Chairmen
 1911: Thomas Latin Nugent Fitzgerald 
 1927: J. Stower

References

External links
 University of Queensland: Queensland Places: Bendemere Shire

Former local government areas of Queensland
2008 disestablishments in Australia
Populated places disestablished in 2008